He Set My Life to Music is the 12th solo studio album by American country artist, Barbara Mandrell. It was released in September 1982 on MCA Records and was produced by Tom Collins. The album was Mandrell's second studio album of the year and her first recording of Inspirational music.

Background and content 
As described by Bill Carpenter of AllMusic, He Set My Life to Music is a "contemporary gospel album." The album contains 10 tracks of mainly cover versions of a series of gospel and inspirational standards. It includes covers of songs such as "What a Friend We Have in Jesus", "Swing Low, Sweet Chariot", and Dottie Rambo's "I Will Glory in the Cross". The album included four duets with mainly Gospel artists. "What a Friend We Have in Jesus" was recorded with B.J. Thomas, "I Turn to Him" with The Blackwood Brothers, "I Will Glory in the Cross" with Dottie Rambo, and "Through It All" with Andrae Crouch.

Release 
The album was re-released many years later under the Universal Special Products. Carpenter gave the album three out of five stars. He Set My Life to Music reached number 59 on the Billboard Top Country Albums chart, and did not spawn any singles. For her performance, Mandrell won the Grammy award for Best Inspirational Performance in 1983. The album also won Mandrell an award for "Album by a Secular Artist" at the  1983 Dove Awards.

The album was released on an LP, with five songs on each side of the record. The album was also released on compact disc in 1991.

Track listing 
Side one 
"What a Friend We Have in Jesus" – (Charles Converse, Joseph Scriven) 3:24
with B.J. Thomas
"Swing Low, Sweet Chariot"/"Swing Chariot" – (Wallace Willis; adapted and arranged by Barbara Mandrell and Tom Collins) 2:55
"I Turn to Him" – (W.T. Davidson) 3:14
with The Blackwood Brothers
"I Will Glory in the Cross" – (Dottie Rambo) 4:14
with Dottie Rambo
"Through It All" – (Andrae Crouch) 3:31
with Andrae Crouch

Side two
"He Set My Life to Music" – (Kye Fleming, Dennis Morgan) 4:36
"He Grew the Tree" – (Chuck Lawrence) 3:56
"Out of the Mouths of Babes" (Adapted and arranged by Barbara Mandrell and Tom Collins) – 2:22
"I'm Yours, Lord" – (Gary Chapman) 2:27
"Then, Now, and Forever" (Adapted and arranged by Barbara Mandrell and Tom Collins) – 5:50

Chart positions

References 

1982 albums
Barbara Mandrell albums
MCA Records albums
Albums produced by Tom Collins (record producer)